Elachista planca is a moth of the family Elachistidae that is endemic to Kenya.

The ground colour of the forewings is brownish grey, indistinctly delimited whitish transverse fascia. There is a white spot on the costa and another similar spot slightly before it at the tornus. The fringe scales in the apex are white, but otherwise grey. The hindwings, including the fringe, are pale brownish grey.

Etymology
The species name refers to the shape of the signum and is derived from Latin planca (meaning board).

References

planca
Moths described in 2009
Endemic moths of Kenya
Moths of Africa